Takayoshi is an impact crater on Mercury.  Its name was adopted by the IAU in 1979.

Takayoshi is north of Barma crater.

References

Impact craters on Mercury